Adolfo Rivera (born May 22, 1982) is a baseball player who is most notable for being on Panama's roster for the 2006 World Baseball Classic. He is 6'4" tall and he weighs 215 pounds. He is right-handed.

Although he appeared in three games in the 2006 World Baseball Classic, he had only one at-bat. He did not get a hit. In his other games, he was caught stealing once and scored one run. He was also on Panama's roster for the 2007 Pan American Games, 2009 Bolivarian Games, 2010 Central American Games, 2010 Central American and Caribbean Games and 2011 Pan American Games.

References

2006 World Baseball Classic players
1982 births
Living people
Baseball players at the 2007 Pan American Games
Baseball players at the 2011 Pan American Games
Pan American Games competitors for Panama
Panamanian baseball players